IRIB TV1 (Shabakeh-e Yek, lit. Channel 1) is one of the 40 national television channels in Iran.

IRIB TV1 was the first national television channel in Iran, and is now the oldest Iranian television channel having been established in 1958. The channel is referred to by some as the National Channel, as most of Islamic Republic of Iran Broadcasting's television budget is set aside for this channel.

The channel has a wide range of programming such as drama series, television premieres of major Iranian movies, and talk shows. Children's shows also air in reruns, but most of them air first-run on IRIB TV2's youth programming block. The channel also has the most watched Iranian news broadcast and televises the Friday prayers. The channel televised major sporting events until IRIB TV3 attained the rights for those broadcasts, as well as numerous viewers.

This channel has been subjected to human rights abuses by airing forced confessions on live television.

Aired programming
The English Briefcase (2000)
Zero Degree Turn 
Zire Tigh (2006)
Top Secret
Daei Jan Napoleon (1976)
Hezar Dastan (1987)
Imam Ali (1996)
Sarbedaran (1984)
Simorgh (1996)
Shelike Nahayi
Fekre Palid
Dar Chashm-e Baad (2009)
Prophet Joseph (2008–2009)
Mokhtarnameh (2010-2011)
The Delight of the Flight (2011-2012)
Paytakht (2011-)
Laughing in the Wind
The Old Fox
Secret Army
Against the Wind
All Saints (2006-2012)
Foyle's War
Stingers
Police Rescue
Columbo
Damenari
Doraemon

References

External links

Television stations in Iran
Persian-language television stations
Islamic Republic of Iran Broadcasting
Television channels and stations established in 1966